The canton of Marguerittes is an administrative division of the Gard department, southern France. Its borders were modified at the French canton reorganisation which came into effect in March 2015. Its seat is in Marguerittes.

It consists of the following communes:
Bouillargues
Caissargues
Garons
Manduel
Marguerittes
Poulx
Rodilhan

References

Cantons of Gard